Kisutu is an administrative ward in the Ilala District of the Dar es Salaam Region of The United Republic Of Tanzania. In 2016 the Tanzania National Bureau of Statistics report there were 10,404 people in the ward, from 8,308 in 2012.

Government offices based in Kisutu
The Tanzania Registration, Insolvency and Trusteeship Agency
The Tanzania Revenue Authority

Media
Kisutu also hosts the Channel 10 Television Station formerly known as Dar es Salaam Television Station at Zaramo Street.

Mosques
Kisutu hosts the following: 
Khoja Shia Ithnasheri Mosque on Indira Gandhi Street.
Saifee Masjid on Zanaki Street.
Ngazija (Commorian) Mosque on India Street.
Sunni Mosque on Mosque Street.
Juma Mosque on Kitumbini Street.
Al-Rawdha Mosque on Mkunguni Street.

References

Ilala District
Wards of Dar es Salaam Region